Trdat (sometimes Latinized as Tiridates), of the Chosroid Dynasty, was the king of Iberia (Kartli, eastern Georgia) from c. 394 to 406. 

According to the Georgian chronicles, he was a son of Rev II, son of Mirian III, the first Christian king of Iberia and Salome. Trdat's brother was  Sauromaces II of Iberia. He is reported to have succeeded, already in an advanced age, his relative and son-in-law, Varaz-Bakur II, and to have been forced to pay tribute to the Sassanids. The chronicles praise his piety and credit Trdat with the construction of churches at Rustavi and Nekresi. The church founded by Trdat at Nekresi is identified by the archaeologist Nodar Bakhtadze with a ruined basilica uncovered in 1998.

References 

Chosroid kings of Iberia
4th-century births
4th-century monarchs in Asia
5th-century monarchs in Asia
5th-century deaths
Vassal rulers of the Sasanian Empire